Paul Edwin Curtis (born September 29, 1947) is a Canadian former professional ice hockey defenceman who played 185 games in the National Hockey League for the Montreal Canadiens, St. Louis Blues, and Los Angeles Kings.  He would also play 76 games in the World Hockey Association with the Michigan Stags and Baltimore Blades.

External links

1947 births
Living people
Baltimore Blades players
Baltimore Clippers players
Canadian ice hockey defencemen
Ice hockey people from Ontario
Los Angeles Kings players
Michigan Stags players
Montreal Canadiens players
St. Louis Blues players
Sportspeople from Peterborough, Ontario